Erilusa secta is a moth in the family Crambidae. It is found in the Brazilian states of Pará and Amazonas.

References

Moths described in 1856
Spilomelinae